Mr. Theertha is a 2010 Indian Kannada-language action drama film directed by Sadhu Kokila. It is a remake of the 1995 Malayalam film Spadikam. The film stars Sudeep, Saloni Aswani and Anant Nag in the lead roles. The music was composed by Gurukiran. The film was dubbed into Telugu as Rowdy Simha and into Hindi as Rowdy Shankar in 2013.

Synopsis
It is a story of young man, estranged from his narcissistic father, upon failing to meet the latter's high expectations for intellectual pursuits.

Plot
Narayana Shastri, a school headmaster (Anant Nag), is never happy with his son, Theertha  (Sudeep), and always degrades him. However, having had enough of him, Theertha  runs away from home only to return as a gangster after long.

Cast
 Sudeep as Tiger Theertha 
 Saloni Aswani as Nayana, Theertha's love interest
 Anant Nag as Master Narayana Shastri, Theertha's father
 Geetha as Annapoorna, Theertha's mother
 Doddanna as Theertha's uncle
 Avinash
 Sadhu Kokila
 Rekha
 Neenasam Ashwath
 Kuri Prathap
 Vidya Venkataram 
 Shobhraj
 Venki 
 Vijayasarathi 
 Prashanth Parthasarathi
 Bank Suresh

Soundtrack
The film's soundtrack was composed by Gurukiran with lyrics penned by Hrudaya Shiva and Kaviraj.

Title Name Change

On 12 November 2009, Director Sadhu Kokila has quietly changed the title of his film Teertha to Mr Teertha.

Reception

Critical response 

A critic from The Times of India scored the film at 2.5 out of 5 stars and says "Sudeep plays a remarkable role with brilliant expressions. Soumya overtakes Saloni with her performance. Anant Nag is simply superb. While Dasari Srinivasa Rao has handled the camera well, the music by Gurukiran is good but fails to register". A critic from The New Indian Express wrote "Sudeep has also acted well. It is pleasant to see beautiful Saloni who played one of the heroines in Upendra’s ‘Budhivantha’. Geetha and Avinash provide good support and Rekha proves her mettle as a villain". A critic from Bangalore Mirror wrote  "The film has a quick narrative and is a good watch overall. Sonali, who returns after her small role in Buddivantha, has a pleasing presence. The songs and camerawork are pleasant.Nanjangud as the backdrop, though not acknowledged in the story, is a welcome change. Teertha is a film you can without doubt, enjoy".

Awards and nominations
Suvarna Film Awards :-
Best Director - Nominated - Sadhu Kokila

References

External links
 

2010 films
2010s Kannada-language films
2010 action drama films
Kannada remakes of Malayalam films
Films directed by Sadhu Kokila
Indian action drama films